Rudawka Rymanowska  (Rudavka Rymanivs’ka) is a village in the administrative district of Gmina Rymanów, within Krosno County, Subcarpathian Voivodeship, in south-eastern Poland.

A small village  situated in the northern part of Bukowskie Foothills over a picturesque gorge of the upper Wisłok River. A well-known part of John Paul II trail in the Low Beskid Mountains – Karol Wojtyła, the late Pope, took the trail six times during his summer vacations. Every year, on last Sunday of August, the town hosts the National Exposition of the Simmental Cattle and the Regional
Championship of Hucul Horse.

National Exposition of the Simmental Cattle

References

Rudawka Rymanowska